Tate's Cairn Highway, opened on 26 June 1991, is a dual 3-lane expressway in Hong Kong. It links Tate's Cairn Tunnel and Ma Liu Shui Interchange, forming a part of Route 2 (formerly known as Route 6).

From the Ma Liu Shui Interchange, where it connects with Route 9, the expressway crosses the estuary of the Shing Mun River. It then turns southwards, interchanging at Shek Mun with a distributor road (Tai Chung Kiu Road), and reaches Siu Lek Yuen, where the highway splits. One branch leads to Tate's Cairn Tunnel (which continues as Route 2), and the other leads to Sha Lek Highway, which eventually joins Route 1 at Sha Tin Road.

The highway is named after Tate's Cairn.

Interchanges 
Tate's Cairn Highway in its entirety falls within the boundaries of Sha Tin District.

{| class="plainrowheaders wikitable"
|+  Tate's Cairn Highway
|-
!scope=col|Location
!scope=col|km
!scope=col|Interchange name
!scope=col|Exit
!scope=col|Destinations
!scope=col|Notes
|-
|rowspan=2|Ma Liu Shui
|style="text-align:right"|18.6
|rowspan=2|Ma Liu Shui Interchange
|style="text-align:center; background:#dff9f9;"|–
|style="background:#dff9f9" | (Tolo Highway) – Tai Po & Fanling
|style="background:#dff9f9" |Northern terminus; end of 
|-
|style="text-align:right"|18.4
|style="text-align:center;"|7A
|Chak Cheung Street – Ma Liu Shui, University, Science Park, Pak Shek Kok, Race Course
|Northbound exit and southbound entrance 
|-
|A Kung Kok
|style="text-align:right"|17.4
|
|style="text-align:center"|7
|Ma On Shan Road – Ma On Shan & Sai Kung
|
|-
|Shek Mun
|style="text-align:right"|16.0
|Shek Mun Interchange
|style="text-align:center;"|6
|Tai Chung Kiu Road and A Kung Kok Street –Shek Mun, Tai Shui Hang, Sha Tin Central, Tsuen Wan
|
|-
|rowspan=5|Siu Lek Yuen
|style="text-align:right"|15.1
|rowspan=4|
|style="text-align:center;"|4
|Siu Lek Yuen Road and Sha Tin Wai Road – Siu Lek Yuen, Prince of Wales Hospital
|Southbound exit and northbound entrance
|-
|style="text-align:right"|15.1
|rowspan=2 style="text-align:center;"|5
| Sha Lek Highway – Kowloon (Central, West)
|Southbound exit and northbound entrance
|-
|style="text-align:right"|14.4
| Sha Lek Highway – Sha Tin Central
|Northbound exit and southbound entrance
|-
|style="text-align:right"|14.3
|style="text-align:center;"|4
|Sha Tin Wai Road – Siu Lek Yuen, Prince of Wales Hospital
|Southbound exit and northbound entrance
|-
|style="text-align:right"|
|
|style="text-align:center; background:#dcdcfe" |–
|style="background:#dcdcfe" | Tate's Cairn Tunnel
|style="background:#dcdcfe" |Southern terminus;  continues

See also 
 List of streets and roads in Hong Kong

Other highways in Kowloon and New Territories:

 Tsing Kwai Highway - Route 3
 Tuen Mun Road - Route 9
 West Kowloon Highway - Route 3
 Tsing Long Highway - Route 3
 Cheung Tsing Highway - Route 3
 Kwun Tong Bypass - Route 2

References
 Roads in Kowloon

External links
 

Expressways in Hong Kong
Sha Tin District
Route 2 (Hong Kong)
Extra areas operated by NT taxis